Andrea Lehotská (born December 2, 1981 in Detva, Slovakia) is a Slovak-Italian television hostess, actress and model.

Biography
In March 2001, Lehotská was one of the twelve finalists in the Miss Slovakia contest for Miss Universe 2001.

In 2003, in Croatia, Lehotská appeared in a television advertisement for Coca-Cola.

In 2004, Lehotská was the VJ for All Music and in the cast of "Spicy Tg"; she debuted as an actress in Che ne sarà di noi of Giovanni Veronesi. In 2005, she appeared in the film Fratello e padre. Also in 2005, Lehotská was in the video clips of Vasco Rossi Buoni o cattivi, Come stai, Un senso E... and Señorita. On September 9, 2005, Rossi released the double DVD È solo un Rock 'n Roll show (with 12 video clips) with Lehotská as protagonist.

From 2005 to 2008, she was a columnist for the television program Markette. In 2007, she was a finalist in Uno due tre stalla, reality show of Canale 5.

In 2008, she played the role of Bibi in the film Albakiara directed by Stefano Salvati. From 2008 to 2009 she has presented BO051 for 7 Gold; in 2009 she is in the cast of fiction Giochi sporchi for Rai 4.

From 2009 to 2010, Lehotská was a co-protagonist in Una cena di Natale quasi perfetta on Sky Uno, and in Sugo, a television program on Rai 4.

From 2009 to 2011, she was a co-protagonist in Chiambretti Night, a television program of Mediaset, and in 2011 Lehotská was a co-protagonist in Chiambretti Sunday Show on Italia 1.

In 2011, she has presented Circo Massimo on Rai 3/RSI La 2. She was also the protagonist of video clip Hayat Öpücüğü of Murat Boz.

In 2012, she was the third finalist of L'isola dei famosi, a reality show. 
From 2012 to 2016, she presented Circo Estate on Rai 3. and the International Circus Festival of Monte-Carlo on Rai 3.

In 2013 Andrea Lehotská presented Cena je správna on TV JOJ. In 2017, she played the role of Regina in the film Tutto quello che vuoi directed by Francesco Bruni.

References

External links
 
 
 

1981 births
Living people
Italian television presenters
21st-century Italian actresses
21st-century Slovak actresses
Italian people of Slovak descent
Slovak female models
Slovak film actresses
Italian film actresses
Italian television actresses
Participants in Italian reality television series
Italian women television presenters
Slovak women television presenters
People from Detva